"Love's on Every Corner" is a song written by Danny Poku, Cathy Dennis, and Paul Taylor for Australian singer Dannii Minogue's second album, Get into You (1993). The song was produced by Dancin' Danny D and was released as the album's second single in November 1992, reaching the top 50 in the United Kingdom. The single was not released in Australia. The song features Dennis and Juliet Roberts on backing vocals, and a demo version of the track with just Dennis's vocals also exists.

Track listings
CD single 1
 "Love's on Every Corner" (7-inch mix)
 "Love's on Every Corner" (12-inch mix)
 "Love's on Every Corner" (Bass in Your Face dub)

CD single 2
 "Love's on Every Corner" (7-inch mix)
 "Love and Kisses"
 "Jump to the Beat"
 "Baby Love"

UK cassette single
 "Love's on Every Corner" (7-inch mix)
 "Love and Kisses"

Personnel
 Dannii Minogue – lead vocals
 Dancin' Danny D – production
 Andrew MacPherson – photography

Charts

References

1992 singles
1992 songs
Dannii Minogue songs
MCA Records singles
Songs written by Cathy Dennis
Songs written by D Mob